The British Colonial Hotel was a historic four-star or AAA four-diamond hotel in downtown Nassau, Bahamas, located on the only private beach in Nassau, on the site of the Old Fort of Nassau. The hotel, originally opened in 1924, has been described as "the Grand Dame of all Nassau hotels", "the most elegant and most expensive hotel in town", and "the most distinctive and pleasant of the island's large hotels". 

The hotel closed on February 15, 2022, due to low bookings during the ongoing COVID-19 pandemic from its clientele primarily of business and convention travelers.

History of the area
The site was occupied in the 19th century by the Old Fort of Nassau to protect the western entrance to the Nassau Harbour until it was demolished in 1873. Long before the fort was built, the first settlement was established here in 1666, when Nassau was known as Charles town, which had developed in a haphazard manner lined with brothels and taverns visited by  pirates, cheats and vagabonds. The presence of pirates in the town caused attacks by Spaniards when the town people fled to American colonies. The town was rebuilt later with a fort and called Nassau, on the site now occupied by the Hotel. The town was attacked again in 1703 by the allied forces of the French and the Spanish who destroyed the fort. Piracy was decimated when the British Governor Woodes Rogers took over in 1718. Over the next two centuries, the town developed under American influence during the 18th and 19th  century witnessing glamour and many buildings of architectural excellence being built with slave labour. It was not until the Greeks came in the 20th century to man the sponging industry that rich started frequenting the island. Prohibition in USA encouraged at that time (1920 to 1933) the  GIs and tourist to visit the island for hooch. It was during this period that major hotels started coming up like the British Colonial Hotel and Fort Montagu, which initially operated for three months during the winter season till the Washington Ball was celebrated.

Hotel history

In 1900, the land was purchased by Henry M. Flagler, responsible for the Breakers Hotel in South Florida. He built an enormous hotel on the site, the Colonial Hotel, which opened in 1901. On March 31, 1922 the wooden hotel burned down. The Bahamian government gave a loan to the Munson Line, which purchased the land and built a brand new seven-story hotel, The New Colonial,  on the site within six months. The hotel celebrated its grand opening on January 7, 1924.

In 1932, the hotel was purchased by Sir Harry Oakes. The local legend is that Oakes bought the hotel on a whim, after experiencing bad service there. Oakes renamed the hotel the British Colonial Hotel. He was a powerful man and a friend of the Duke of Windsor. He was later murdered in 1943 under mysterious circumstances (the mystery remains unresolved), which was called the "murder of the century".

The hotel was bought by Florida-based Gill Hotels in 1960 and became part of Sheraton Hotels in November 1962 as the Sheraton British Colonial, the chain's fourth ever franchise. Sheraton operated the hotel until 1989, when it became part of Best Western Hotels as the British Colonial Beach Resort. The old hotel building was gradually closed up over the course of the 1990s, with rooms eventually operating in only a small portion of the complex. Finally, in 1997 it was purchased by RHK, who renovated it at a cost of over $90 million. They completely gutted and modernized the interiors, but retained its façade of towers, galleries, and molded reliefs. The hotel reopened in October 1999, managed by Hilton Hotels, as the British Colonial Hilton Nassau. It was renovated in June 2009 at a cost of US$15 million,

The hotel was sold on October 24, 2014 to the China State Construction Engineering Corporation. From 2016-2019, the group constructed a $250 million complex, originally known as The Pointe, adjacent to the British Colonial, located on the hotel's former parking lot. The hotel and condominium towers of The Pointe have since been branded as Margaritaville Beach Resort Nassau.

The hotel closed temporarily in early 2020, due to the COVID-19 pandemic. It reopened on December 15, 2020, but closed again on February 15, 2022, due to continued low bookings during the ongoing pandemic from its clientele primarily of business and convention travelers. The hotel ceased to be associated with the Hilton chain that day. China Construction America (CCA) announced on February 2, 2022, that they were in discussions with other operators, hoping to reopen the hotel soon under a new brand.

Interior

On one side of the hotel is a tropical garden and the pool overlooking the harbor. The main restaurants are Aqua, serving international cuisine and Portofino serving Italian-Caribbean fusion cuisine, and the Bullion Bar serves drinks and snacks. The lobby is luxurious, with marble titles and antiques and features the Blackbeard’s Cove Lobby bar and nightly Bahamian/Caribbean music. All of the rooms are decorated in colonial décor. A relief depicting Christopher Columbus is situated high on the grand central tower of the hotel, and at the front of the hotel is a statue of Woodes Rogers, the ex-privateer who proved effective against piracy in the area. A mural depicting the history of the Bahamas was added in 1999 to the entrance hall.

Facilities
The hotel has six floors spread over an 8-acre plot and has 288 guest rooms, 20 suites and 47 executive-level rooms. It has a 300-foot-long private white sand beach which features complimentary kayaking and snorkeling. The hotel has been fully modernised with new electronics and furnishings.

James Bond
The hotel was used as a filming location for the James Bond film Never Say Never Again, starring Sean Connery. The character Fatima Blush (Barbara Carrera) waterskis in front of the resort and onto the end of the pier, into James Bond's arms, to the hotel’s old gazebo bar (located on the left of the picture in the infobox). The pier was especially built for the movie and the hotel kept it.

References

External links

Official site
Flickr images
Official 2008 video

Hotel buildings completed in 1924
Hotels in Nassau, Bahamas
Hotels established in 1924
1924 establishments in the British Empire
Sheraton hotels